Red Zebra may refer to: 

Red Zebra (mbuna), tropical fish from Lake Malawi
Red Zebra (band), Belgian new wave band
Red Zebra Broadcasting, American media corporation and radio station operator
The nickname of Taiwan Railways EMU1200 series train